Oil regeneration - is extraction of contaminants from oil in order to restore its original properties to be used equally with fresh oils.

Oil aging
Aging is a result of physical and chemical processes that change oil during storage and use in machines and mechanisms.
The main cause of aging is exposure to high temperatures and contact with air that leads to oxidation, decomposition, polymerization and condensation of hydrocarbons. Another cause of aging is contamination with metal particles, water and dust. Their accumulation leads to buildup of slurries, resinous and asphaltic compounds, coke, soot, various salts and acids in the oils.
The oil in which aging process occurs, cannot fully perform its functions. Therefore, it is either replaced with new oil or regenerated.

Regeneration by physical methods
Physical methods of regeneration do not change the chemical properties of oil. They remove only mechanical impurities (metal particles, sand, dust, as well as tar, asphalt and coke-like substances, water).
Regeneration by physical methods include:
 sedimentation. This method is often used as the first stage in regeneration.  The contamination particles in oil settle down, due to gravity;
 centrifugation - separates oil into layers (an oil layer, a rag layer, a water layer,) by centrifugal forces;
 filtration - separates suspensions into clean liquid and wet sediment with the help of filters;
 Washing with water and dry washing to remove acidic products from oil (water-soluble low-molecular acids, salts of organic acids).

Regeneration by physicochemical methods

Physicochemical methods are based on the use of coagulants and adsorbents. Coagulants promote the coarsening and precipitation of fine-dispersed asphalt-resinous substances in oil. Adsorbents selectively absorb organic and inorganic compounds. These methods remove asphalt and resinous compounds, emulsified and dissolved water from oil. Adsorptive treatment with bleaching clays neutralizes free acid in acid-treated oil, unstable oxidized and sulphurized products as well as traces of sulphonic acid. In addition, clay treatment leads to higher resistance to oil oxidation at high temperatures and increased colour stability. This process is used in clay polishing plants for waste oil re-refining and transformer oil regeneration systems for the reclamation of old transformer oil to as-new condition.

Regeneration by chemical methods

Chemical methods of regeneration remove asphalt, silicic, acidic, some hetero-organic compounds and water from oils. These methods are based on the interaction of contaminating substances in oil with special reagents introduced into them. The compounds formed as a result of these chemical reactions are then easily removed from oil. Chemical methods include acid and alkaline refining, drying with calcium sulphate or reduction with metal hydrides.

Choice of methods of regeneration

In practice, to achieve a complete regeneration of oil using only one method is difficult. Therefore, a combination of different approaches are often used.

References

External links
 An Environmental Review of Waste Oils Regeneration. Why the Regeneration of Waste Oils Must Remain an EU Policy Priority

Oils
Recycling